Rosendal Palace is a Swedish palace pavilion located on Djurgården,  an island in central Stockholm. It was built  between 1823 and 1827 for King Karl XIV Johan, the first Bernadotte King of Sweden. It was intended as an escape from the formalities of court life at the Royal Palace.

Rosendal Palace was largely designed by Fredrik Blom, one of the leading architects of the time, who received a royal commission to draw and build the palace building after the original buildings  burned down.  Fredrik August Lidströmer,  Stockholm's City Architect from 1818 to 1824, had been King Karl XIV Johan's primary architect at the construction of the original Rosendal Palace. After it burned down in 1819, Lidströmer also created the initial drawings for the replacement palace. These were then adapted and redrawn by Fredrik Blom, who had been an assistant to Jonas Lidströmer, father of  Fredrik August Lidströmer.  The Queen's Pavilion at  Rosendal Palace (Swedish:Drottningpaviljongen)) and Guard's Cottage (Swedish:Vaktstugan) remained entirely the work of Fredrik August Lidströmer.

The creation of the Rosendal Palace in the 1820s marked the beginning of the development of Djurgården into  a stately residential area. When King Oskar II died in 1907, his heirs decided to make Rosendal Palace a museum of the Karl Johan period and of the life of Karl XIV Johan. This makes Rosendal Palace a unique documentation of the European Empire style, in Sweden also known as the Karl Johan style. The Karl Johan style remained popular in Scandinavia even as the Empire style disappeared in other parts of Europe.

The palace stands today largely as it did in Karl XIV Johan's lifetime. During the summer months the palace is open to visitors for guided tours. Prince Carl Philip and his wife Princess Sofia lived at Rosendal Palace 2015-2017 while their permanent home, Villa Solbacken, was being renovated.

See also
 Architecture of Stockholm

References

Laine, Christian. Rosendals Slott, De Kungliga Slotten. Byggförlaget Kultur: 2003. .

External links

Official Website
Destination Stockholm
Museums in Stockholm

Palaces in Stockholm
Crown palaces in Sweden
Museums in Stockholm
Historic house museums in Sweden
Listed buildings in Stockholm